Serdyuk, or serdiuk  (serdenyata, convivial serdyuk's (willing infantry) regiments) were mercenary infantry units kept by the Hetman's  from the second half of the 17th century through the first quarter of the 18th century and formed the Hetman's guard. Serdyuk recruited mainly from the Ukrainian population and the Kozaks of Cossack Hetmanate and Zaporizhian Sich. The average Serdyuk regiment consisted of 400-500 soldiers. They served at the border and inside the country, and guarded the Hetman's residence. By decree of the Russian Tsar on July 14, 1726, the convivial serdyuk's units were disbanded.

Sources 
 Бутич І. Л. Сердюки //  Енциклопедія історії України : у 10 т. / редкол.: В. А. Смолій (голова) та ін. ; Інститут історії України НАН України. — К. : Наук. думка, 2012. — Т. 9 : Прил — С. — С. 541. — .

Literature 
 Сокирко О. Лицарі другого сорту. Наймане військо Лівобережної Гетьманщини 1669—1726 рр. — Київ: Темпора, 2006.
 Українське козацтво. Мала енциклопедія. — Київ: Генеза, 2002. С. 442.

Cossack Hetmanate
Military units and formations of Ukraine
Military history of Ukraine